Neocollyris acuteapicalis is a species of ground beetle in the genus Neocollyris in the family Carabidae. It was described by Horn in 1913.

References

Acuteapicalis, Neocollyris
Beetles described in 1913
Taxa named by Walther Horn